North Torrance High School is a four-year public high school located at 3620 W. 182nd St. in Torrance, California.  Of the four public high schools in the Torrance Unified School District, North High is the second oldest.  The school's mascot is the Saxon and the school colors are blue and white. North High is accredited by Western Association of Schools and Colleges.

School facts
Opened in September 1955
Campus has 24 buildings and 100 classrooms
Serves youth living north of 190th St. to north city boundaries
Maximum student enrollment capacity is 3000

Athletics
North High was 1971 CIF 4A (Largest school division) Baseball Champions beating Chaffey HS 9-0 Jim O'Brien head coach

North High's Dennis Littlejohn (San Francisco Giants drafted 1st rd #2 overall) named 1971 CIF baseball player of the year

North High was 1972 CIF 4A (Largest school division) Baseball Runner Up losing to Dominguez HS 5-4 Jim O'Brien head coach

North High was 1974 CIF 4A (Largest school division) Baseball Champions beating Lakewood HS 1-0 Jim O'Brien head coach

North High was also named Cal Hi best school baseball team for the 1974 season  with a season record or 26-6-1

North High's Tim O'Neal was named CIF baseball player of the year (who pitched both sides of the 21 inning championship game)

The 1974 Championship game began at Anaheim Stadium ended in a 0–0 tie after a curfew of time then to be completely replayed a couple days later at USC's Rod Dedeaux field for a 1–0 victory for a total of 21 innings, clearly one of the if not the greatest championship games in High school baseball history. North High's Tim O'Neal pitched both games.

Prior to 2003–2004 North High was in the Ocean League and also The Bay League.  In 2007–2008 North High was voted by the Pioneer League as the runner-up for Most Athletic School.

Team accomplishments
The 1982 track and field team, under head coach Steve Schmitz, went on to win the Bay League and CIF under a record setting year by hurdler James Ferreira, sprinter and football stand-out, James Harper, Bernard Johns, Rodney Trammell, Johne Maemura (distance), David Rucker, Philip Cannon (400/800) and Mark Sager (shot put). The 4X100 and 4X400 (Harper, Johns, Trammell, Cannon) went on to win CIF and still holds the school record.
The year after a 3-4 1982 season, which had 15 juniors starting, the 1983 Varsity Football team, under the direction of North coach Steve Schmitz, went 13-1-0 to beat out strong West Torrance and Santa Monica teams for the Bay League Championship. The team went on storm through to the C.I.F Coastal Conference where they fell in the finals to William S Hart High in a hard-fought battle in the rain and mud at College of the Canyons.
In 2001 fall season the Varsity Football team were runners-up in the CIF Division X Championship
In 2002–2003 winter season boys varsity wrestling won CIF Div. II in both Individual and Duals (Duals was held at Home)
In 2002–2003 spring season boys varsity track won league: Specelle Williams and Eric Davis went to CIF finals
In 2003–2004 winter season the varsity wrestling team were Division II CIF Champions in both duals and individuals. 103lbs wrestler Mathew Bautista was national Champion 
In 2004 fall the Varsity Football team went undefeated in the Pioneer League and were runners-up in the CIF Division X Championship.
In 2007–2008 winter season the varsity wrestling team were Coastal Div. CIF Individual Champions.
In 2008–2009 winter season the boys varsity soccer team were CIF semifinalists and suffered a tough loss in penalty kicks.
In 2008–2009 winter season the boys varsity soccer team advanced to State.
In the 2008 fall season the girls varsity tennis team were league champions.
In 2009–2010 winter season the boys varsity soccer team were league champs.
In the 2008 and 2009 spring season the girls softball team were back-to-back CIF Champions. In 2010 they were in the CIF final for the third straight year
In 2010 spring season the boys varsity volleyball team were CIF semifinalists
In 2009 fall the varsity football team won the Pioneer League title
In 2009–2010 winter season boys varsity league champs and back to back CIF semifinalists
In 2009–2010 winter season girls varsity basketball won the title Pioneer League
In 2010–2011 North High School's marching band won state championships in the 2A division
In 2009–2010 and 2011–2012 North High School's marching band came in 2nd place at state championships in the 2A division
In 2011–2012 winter season the varsity wrestling team won CIF Duals Division III
In 2012 varsity football team reached the CIF Southern Section championship after  2–8 record from the previous season
In 2012 North High Saxon Regiment Marching Band and Color Guard won state championships in the 3A division
In 2013 and 2014 Spring season Boys Varsity Track & Field were undefeated two-time Pioneer League Champions
In 2013 and 2014 North High Saxon Regiment and Color Guard won 2nd in SCJA State Championships in the 2A and 3A division, respectively
In 2014 and 2015 Spring season Girls Varsity Track & Field were undefeated two-time Pioneer League Champions
In 2014 the North High School Saxon Regiment and Color Guard received 2nd place in division 3A championships and 8th place in open class Grand Championships against 15 competing bands
In 2015 The North High Girls Basketball wins Division III CIF
In 2015-2016 North High Varsity Softball won title CIF SS Division 4 Final
In 2019 The North High Saxon Regiment and Color Guard won 2nd Place at CSBC championships and 3rd Place at CSBC Grand Championships

Notable alumni
Jason Acuña (born 1973), stuntman
Nanette Barragán (born 1976), Member of the U.S. House of Representatives from California's 44th district
William Bonin (1947–1996), serial killer and rapist
Chris Demaria (born 1980), baseball player
Chris Farasopoulos (born 1949), football player New York Jets
Malcolm B. Frost (born 1966), U.S. Army major general
Bob Hite (1943–1981), Co-lead vocalist of Canned HeatJesse Juarez (born 1981), professional mixed martial artist and  wrestler
Dennis Littlejohn (born 1954), baseball player
Chris Mortensen (born 1951), journalist
Emanuel Newton (born 1984), professional Mixed Martial Artist
Chuck Norris (born 1940), actor and martial artist
Nathan Salmon (born 1951), philosopher (Class of 1969)
Aaron Takahashi, actor
Tiny Ron Taylor (1947–2019), actor and baseball player

Campus radio station

A campus radio station, first on a closed-circuit basis and (after 1966) on FM as KNHS at 89.7 MHz, operated from 1957 to 1991.

 North High JROTC The North High JROTC' Program was formed in 1996 and operational as of 1997. The North High JROTC Program has been a recipient of the Honor Unit with Distinction since 2000.  This status is given to 10% of JROTC programs worldwide. North High's JROTC program has been known for hosting the Golden Bear National Drill competition.  As of 2021 the program is being run by Lieutenant Colonel Noland Flores and Command Sergeant Major Michael Baker.

Golden Bear 
Golden Bear is a West Coast National Drill Meet that consists of competitions for four divisions including unarmed, armed, color guard, and saber.  It is currently the largest JROTC competition on the West Coast with as many at 60+ schools, which also include the JROTC units in South Korea, and Japan, attending.

References

External links

North High School Alumni Organization (unofficial)
North Torrance High Alumni on Myspace

Education in Torrance, California
Buildings and structures in Torrance, California
Public high schools in Los Angeles County, California
Educational institutions established in 1955
1955 establishments in California